Alexis Corydon Hobson (February 25, 1880 – October 20, 1960) was an American college football player.

University of Virginia
Hobson was a prominent end for the Virginia Cavaliers of the University of Virginia.

1900
Hobson was selected All-Southern in 1900. Virginia claims a Southern championship that year. The team gave Sewanee its first loss in three years by a score of 17 to 5, Hobson once saving a touchdown by tackling College Football Hall of Fame running back Henry Seibels.

References

External links
 

1880 births
1960 deaths
American football ends
Virginia Cavaliers football players
All-Southern college football players
Players of American football from Richmond, Virginia